The 18th Golden Horse Awards (Mandarin:第18屆金馬獎) took place on October 30, 1981 at Kaohsiung Cultural Center in Kaohsiung, Taiwan.

Winners and nominees 
Winners are listed first, highlighted in boldface.

References

18th
1981 film awards
1981 in Taiwan